Manasseh is both a given name and a surname. Its variants include Manasses and Manasse.

Notable people with the name include:

Surname
 Ezekiel Saleh Manasseh (died 1944), Singaporean rice and opium merchant and hotelier
 Jacob Manasseh (died 1832), Ottoman rabbi
 Leonard Manasseh (1916–2017), British architect
 Maurice Manasseh (born 1943), English cricketer

Given name
Manasseh (tribal patriarch), first son of Joseph
Manasseh of Judah, king of Judah in the 7th century BC
Manasseh II, hypothetical Jewish ruler of the Khazars in the 9th century BC
Manasseh Azure, freelance journalist in Accra, Ghana
Manasseh Masseh Lopes (1755–1831), British politician
Manasseh Rundial, South Sudanese politician
Manasseh Sogavare (born 1955), Solomon Islands politician and Prime Minister

Fictional characters
Manassseh da Costa, The King of Schnorrers

See also